Helwith is a hamlet and farm in North Yorkshire, England about 6 miles north-west of Richmond.  It lies in the valley of Marske Beck, a tributary of the River Swale, in an area historically important for lead mining.
 It is part of the civil parish of New Forest.

References

External links

Hamlets in North Yorkshire
Richmondshire